Rodrigo Alonso Morales Godoy (born 5 August 1994) is a Venezuelan professional footballer who plays as a defender or midfielder for El Vigía.

Career
Morales' career began with Estudiantes de Mérida. He made his professional bow in the Primera División on 26 October 2014, with the player being substituted on for Javier Guillén after seventy-three minutes of a match with Llaneros. Two further substitute appearances in league and cup followed during the 2015 campaign against Mineros de Guayana and Deportivo Táchira, before Morales started for the first time in February 2016 versus Petare; which was one of seven matches in 2016 as Estudiantes placed thirteenth overall. In 2017, Morales joined El Vigía of the Segunda División.

Career statistics
.

References

External links

1994 births
Living people
Place of birth missing (living people)
Venezuelan footballers
Association football defenders
Association football midfielders
Venezuelan Primera División players
Venezuelan Segunda División players
Estudiantes de Mérida players
Atlético El Vigía players